Sparreholm is a locality situated in Flen Municipality, Södermanland County, Sweden with 741 inhabitants in 2010.

Riksdag elections

References 

Populated places in Södermanland County
Populated places in Flen Municipality